Segnas railway station is a railway station in the municipality of Disentis/Mustér, in the Swiss canton of Grisons. It is an intermediate stop on the  gauge Furka Oberalp line of the Matterhorn Gotthard Bahn.

Services 
The following services stop at Segnas:

References

External links 
 
 

Railway stations in Graubünden
Matterhorn Gotthard Bahn stations
Disentis